Les Newbies was a Canadian comedy television series that broadcast from 16 January 2019 to 10 June 2020 on Unis TV. The series, which followed the fictional life of three Acadian comedians, was also available on TV5 Monde and ICI TOU.TV.

Synopsis 
André, Luc et Christian are three friends who dream of becoming famous with their comedy group, Les Newbies (The Newbies or Beginners). In Moncton, they perform at local bars and community halls to try and launch their careers and hopefully one day achieve fame and recognition, and perhaps perform at Just for Laughs in Montreal. Their path to stardom is not as easy as they believe and through pitfalls, conflicts and disappointments, the Newbies (also a nickname for people from New Brunswick) may find that they may not be the success they thought they would be. Perhaps there is more balance to be found in their lives.

Cast 
Several Acadian and Quebecois actors and actresses had roles in the series.
 Christian Essiambre : Christian
 André Roy : André
 Luc LeBlanc : Luc
 Raphaëlle Lalande : Amélie
 Catherine Bérubé : Ann-Julie
 Marc Lamontagne : Lamont
 Roxane Gaudette-Loiseau : Karine
 Ricardo Trogi : Michel Lévesque
 Cloé Lévesque : Sophie
 Matthieu Girard : Jean-Marc
 Bianca Richard : Kim
 Karen Elkin : Valérie Babineau
 Denise Bouchard : Marcelle Robichaud
 Ryan Doucette : Réjean Picard
 Emmanuel Charest : Jean-Pierre Ducharme
 Karène Chiasson : Isabelle
 Raphaël Butler : Rick
 Robert Maillet : Bob
 Philippe Laprise : lui-même
 Dominic et Martin : eux-mêmes
 Valérie Blais : elle-même
 Yves P. Pelletier : lui-même
 Jean-Sébastien Lévesque : lui-même
 Michel Thériault : lui-même
 Lucie Laurier : elle-même
 Xavier Gould : Jass-Sainte
 Julien Dionne : Sean

Le Grand Ménage des fêtes 
Following the series two seasons, the group hosted an annual animated special called Le Grand Ménage des fêtes (English: The Great Holiday Cleanup).  Intended for Francophone audiences in Canada, the hour-long special offers cleaning tips and a humorous look at the year's events, interspersed with sketches and musical performances.

References

External links 

 Ressource relative à l'audiovisuel : 
 (en) Internet Movie Database   
 
 Les Newbies sur TOU.TV

2010s Canadian comedy television series
2020s Canadian comedy television series
2019 Canadian television series debuts
2020 Canadian television series endings
Unis original programming